Louis Crosby Wyman (March 16, 1917 – May 5, 2002) was an American politician and lawyer. He was a U.S. Representative and, for three days, a U.S. Senator from New Hampshire. This was one of the shortest tenures in Senate history. He was a member of the Republican Party.

Early life and career
Wyman was born on March 16, 1917, in Manchester, New Hampshire, the son of Alice Sibley (Crosby) and Louis Eliot Wyman. He graduated from the University of New Hampshire at Durham in 1938 and from Harvard Law School in 1941. He was admitted to the bars of Massachusetts and New Hampshire in 1941, and of Florida in 1957, and commenced the practice of law in Boston, Massachusetts, at Ropes and Gray.

During the Second World War, he served in the Alaskan Theater as a lieutenant in the United States Naval Reserve from 1942 to 1946. He also served as general counsel to a United States Senate committee in 1946; secretary to Senator Styles Bridges in 1947; counsel to the Joint Congressional Committee on Foreign Economic Cooperation from 1948 to 1949; attorney general of New Hampshire from 1953 to 1961; president of the National Association of Attorneys General in 1957; and as legislative counsel to the Governor of New Hampshire in 1961; member and chairman of several state legal and judicial commissions. His attempts to investigate alleged communists as attorney general lead to the Supreme Court case Sweezy v. New Hampshire, which ruled against the state and Wyman on due process grounds.

He was swept out in the Democratic landslide of 1964, but regained his seat in 1966 and was reelected three more times.

Senate election

Wyman did not run for reelection to his House seat in 1974, opting instead to run for the Senate seat that was due to come open by 20-year incumbent Norris Cotton's retirement.  The initial returns showed him defeating Democratic candidate John A. Durkin by 355 votes on election night.

Durkin demanded a recount, which resulted in Durkin winning by ten votes. Governor Meldrim Thomson then certified Durkin as the winner.  However, Wyman demanded another recount in which he prevailed by two votes.  Cotton resigned on December 31, 1974; Thomson appointed Wyman to the seat for the balance of the term ending January 3, 1975, to give him a leg up in seniority.  This appeared to end the dispute, but Durkin appealed to the full Senate, which is the final arbiter of Senate elections per the Constitution.

The Senate Rules Committee, which has jurisdiction over the results of Senate elections, then deadlocked on whether to seat Wyman for the 1975–1981 term pending the resolution of the dispute.  On January 14, the Senate returned the matter to the Rules Committee, which returned 35 disputed points to the full Senate based on 3,000 questionable ballots. However, the Senate was unable to break a deadlock on even one of the 35 points.

After seven months of wrangling which included six unsuccessful Democratic attempts to seat Durkin, Wyman, having never been seated, proposed that he and Durkin run again in a special election.  Durkin agreed, and the Senate declared the seat officially vacant on August 8, 1975, pending the new election.  Thomson appointed Cotton to his old seat in the meantime. The special election was held on September 16, and Durkin won handily, defeating Wyman by nearly 28,000 votes—ending what is still the closest Senate election since the people gained the right to directly elect Senators with the passage of the 17th Amendment in 1913.

Later life
Wyman served as an associate justice of the New Hampshire Superior Court from 1978 to 1987. He was a resident of Manchester, N.H. and West Palm Beach, Florida, until his death due to cancer on May 5, 2002. Wyman's remains were cremated, and the ashes scattered at sea.

See also
Unseated members of the United States Congress

References

Official Congressional Directory: 93rd Congress (1974) 
Manual for the New Hampshire General Court (1979), page 412

External links 
 Retrieved on 2008-01-25

|-

|-

|-

|-

1917 births
2002 deaths
20th-century American judges
20th-century American lawyers
20th-century American politicians
21st-century American lawyers
American anti-communists
Deaths from cancer in Florida
Harvard Law School alumni
Massachusetts lawyers
New Hampshire Attorneys General
New Hampshire lawyers
New Hampshire state court judges
Republican Party members of the United States House of Representatives from New Hampshire
Republican Party United States senators from New Hampshire
United States Navy officers
United States Navy personnel of World War II
University of New Hampshire alumni